Københavnere is a 1933 Danish film directed by Lau Lauritzen Sr. and written by Lau Lauritzen Jr. and Alice O'Fredericks.

Cast
Christian Arhoff as  Erik's stedfar 
Olga Svendsen as Olivia 
Agnes Rehni as Direktørfruen 
Aase Clausen as Danserinden 
Erling Schroeder as Erik 
Ib Schønberg   
Holger Strøm   
Per Knutzon   
Alex Suhr    
Anton De Verdier  
Randi Michelsen   
Ellen Jansø  
Ingeborg Pehrson   
Christian Schrøder   
Carl Schenstrøm  
Harald Madsen  
Mona Mårtenson  
Erling Schroeder 
Olga Svendsen 
 Anton de Verdier
Christian Schrøder 
Einar Juhl 
Alex Suhr 
Christen Møller 
Jørgen Lund 
Poul Reichhardt  
Asbjørn Andersen  
Henry Nielsen  
Aage Bendixen  
Bruno Tyron  
Gerda Neumann  
Else Nielsen  
Johannes Andresen
Ejner Bjørkman

External links
Københavnere at the Danish Film Database

1930s Danish-language films
1933 films
Danish black-and-white films
Films directed by Lau Lauritzen Sr.
Danish comedy films
1933 comedy films